"Hurricane" is the 15th single released by Japanese pop duo Puffy AmiYumi. It is a cover of a song originally performed in 1981 by "Chanels" (later Rats & Star). The song contains MIDI instruments and brass instruments. The subway version is featured in the album Music from the Subway.

Track listing
The tracks are featured in Hurricane Punch.
Hurricane
Hurricane (Hunya's Subway Edit)
Hurricane (Sally's karaoke version)
Hurricane (Hunya's Fruity Commercial Edit)

External links 
Puffy AmiYumi.com page

2002 singles
Puffy AmiYumi songs
2002 songs